The Hockey East All-Tournament Team is an honor bestowed at the conclusion of the NCAA Division I Hockey East conference tournament to the players judged to have performed the best during the championship. Currently the team is composed of three forwards, two defensemen and one goaltender with additional players named in the event of a tie. Voting for the honor is conducted by the head coaches of each member team once the tournament has completed and any player regardless of their team's finish is eligible.

The All-Tournament Team began being awarded after the first championship in 1985 and has been named every year since, excluding 2020 as the tournament was cancelled due to the coronavirus pandemic. 

There have been 21 players named to the All-Tournament team despite their school not playing in the Championship game.

Two teams failed to have a player named to the All-Tournament team despite playing in the Championship game, Vermont in 2008 and UMass Lowell in 2015. Both were the runner-up schools.

All-Tournament Teams

1980s

1990s

2000s

2010s

2020s

All-Tournament Team players by school

Multiple appearances

See also
Hockey East Awards
Tournament Most Valuable Player

References

External links
Hockey East

College ice hockey trophies and awards in the United States